General elections were held in Tanzania on 14 December 2005. Originally scheduled for 30 October, the elections were postponed due to the death of CHADEMA vice-presidential candidate Jumbe Mohamed Jumbe. The elections were the third since the country returned to multi-party rule in 1992. Incumbent President Benjamin Mkapa stepped down after two consecutive terms in accordance with the constitution. Elections for the Presidency of Zanzibar and its House of Representatives took place on 30 October, as scheduled.

The presidential election was won by Jakaya Kikwete of Chama Cha Mapinduzi (CCM), with Ibrahim Lipumba of the Civic United Front placing second. In the parliamentary elections the CCM won 264 of the 323 seats.

Presidential candidates

Union
Jakaya Kikwete – Chama Cha Mapinduzi (CCM)
Paul Henry Kyara – Sauti ya Umma (SAU)
Ibrahim Lipumba – Civic United Front (CUF)
Emmanuel Makaidi – National League for Democracy (NLD)
Freeman Mbowe – Chama cha Demokrasia na Maendeleo (CHADEMA)
Augustine Mrema – Tanzania Labour Party (TLP)
Christopher Mtikila – Democratic Party (DP)
Sengondo Mvungi – National Convention for Construction and Reform-Mageuzi (NCCR-Mageuzi). He was also supported by the Forum for the Restoration of Democracy (FORD), National Reconstruction Alliance (NRA), Union for Multiparty Democracy (UMD), and United People's Democratic Party (UPDP).
Anna Senkoro – Progressive Party of Tanzania-Maendeleo (PPT-Maendeleo)
Leonard Shayo – Demokrasia Makini (MAKINI)

Zanzibar
Amani Abeid Karume – Chama Cha Mapinduzi (CCM)
Seif Shariff Hamad – Civic United Front (CUF)
Haji Mussa Kitole – Jahazi Asilia
Abdallah Ali Abdallah – Democratic Party (DP)
Mariam Omar – Sauti ya Umma (SAU)
Simai Abdulrahman Abdallah – National Reconstruction Alliance (NRA)

Results

President

Parliament

Zanzibar President

Zanzibar House of Representatives

Note: A re-run of the invalidated election took place on 14 December 2005.

See also
List of Tanzania National Assembly members 2005–2010

References

External links
Uchaguzi Tanzania (in Swahili) 
Chama Cha Mapinduzi official site (in Swahili)
Chama cha Democracia na Maendeleo (in Swahili) 
Civic United Front official site (in English/Swahili)
National Electoral Commission

Presidential elections in Tanzania
Elections in Tanzania
Tanzania
Tanzania